This is a list of council wards in Bristol by population based on the results of the 2011 census. The next United Kingdom census will take place in 2021. In 2011, there were 35 ward subdivisions in Bristol, shown in the table below.

Refer to the Subdivisions of Bristol article in order to understand that a 'built up area' city county such as Bristol has no extensive rural spaces or villages within its borders, so instead census data population counts are listed for well-defined ward divisions as opposed to less defined neighbourhood areas.

This article is for historical purposes as electoral changes will be made throughout England from 2016, Bristol will ultimately lose one ward and several will be renamed and merged - see the ward table for full details.

List of wards

See also 
 List of places in Bristol

References

External links 
 Link to ONS built up area statistics
 Bristol Council 2011 census page

Settlements
NUTS 2 statistical regions of the European Union
South West England
Bristol